Joseph Jenne Cannon (May 22, 1877 – November 5, 1945) was a Utah politician and newspaper editor and was a leader in the Church of Jesus Christ of Latter-day Saints (LDS Church). He was a member of the prominent Cannon political family.

Biography
As a young man, Cannon served as a missionary for the LDS Church in Europe. He accompanied LDS Church apostle Francis M. Lyman in offering prayers in St. Petersburg and Moscow which dedicated Russia for the preaching of Mormonism in August 1903. Lyman and Cannon also similarly dedicated Finland in 1903.

In the 1908 election, Cannon was elected as a member of the Utah House of Representatives from Salt Lake County. He served one term, from 1909 to 1911. Cannon was not formally associated with any political party.

From 1931 to 1934, Cannon was the editor of the Deseret News, a Salt Lake City newspaper owned by the LDS Church. His tenure ended when the LDS Church asked him to become the president of the church's British Mission. Cannon served in this capacity for three years, until 1937.

Immediately following his return to Utah, Cannon was asked to become the first assistant to George Q. Morris, the general superintendent of the church's Young Men's Mutual Improvement Association. Cannon served in this capacity until his death from pancreatic cancer in 1945.

Notes

References
Andrew Jenson, Encyclopedia History of the Church

1877 births
1945 deaths
20th-century Mormon missionaries
American Mormon missionaries in England
American Mormon missionaries in Finland
American Mormon missionaries in Russia
American newspaper editors
Deaths from cancer in Utah
Cannon family
Counselors in the General Presidency of the Young Men (organization)
Deaths from pancreatic cancer
Deseret News people
Members of the Utah House of Representatives
Mission presidents (LDS Church)
American people of Manx descent
Latter Day Saints from Utah